Ram Awana (born 1 March 1971) is an Indian film and television actor. He is best known for his role as Raja Paundrak in Dwarkadheesh – Bhagwaan Shree Krishn, Chanur in Jai Shri Krishna, Farooq in DD's Shikwah, Raja Chhatrasal in Shri Prannathji, It's Complicated: Relationship Ka Naya Status, Sarojini - Ek Nayi Pehal, Crime Patrol, Balika Vadhu, Gutur Gu, Adaalat, CID, Durga and many more.

Career
He has worked in more than 200 Hindi TV shows. He appeared in a German feature film, Best Chance by Marcus H. Rosenmüller in 2014. He will be seen in Dwarkadheesh Bhagwaan Shree Krishn Season 2 as "Shakuni", that will soon be aired on Dangal TV. Currently he is working as Muchadd Babu in Color's Tv Most Popular Show Barrister Babu.

Filmography

Films

TV serials

References

Male actors from Madhya Pradesh
1971 births
Living people
People from Noida
Indian male television actors
Male actors in Hindi television
Male actors in Hindi cinema
Indian male film actors
21st-century Indian male actors
20th-century Indian male actors